Nizhal Yudham is a 1981 Indian Malayalam-language film, directed by Baby and produced by Thiruppathi Chettiyar. The film stars Sukumaran, Ravikumar, Sumalatha and Jagathy Sreekumar. The film has musical score by K. J. Joy.

Cast
Sukumaran as Ramesh
Ravikumar as Gopi
Sumalatha as Radha
Jagathy Sreekumar as Preman
Jose Prakash as Unnithan
C. I. Paul as Sekhar
Manavalan Joseph as Keshava Pilla
PK Abraham as Gopalan
Kalaranjini as Sobha 
Janardhanan as D'Zuza
Prathapachandran as Adv Menon
Kaviyoor Ponnamma as Devaki
Pala Thankam as Keshava pilla's wife
Silk Smitha as Dancer
 Alleppey Ashraf 
 Sathyachithra as Santha

Soundtrack
The music was composed by K. J. Joy and the lyrics were written by Devadas and Pappanamkodu Lakshmanan.

References

External links
 

1981 films
1980s Malayalam-language films
Films directed by Baby (director)